The Coupe de France Final 2005 was a football match held at Stade de France, Saint-Denis, on 4 June 2005, that saw Auxerre defeat Sedan 2–1, winning on goals from Benjani and Bonaventure Kalou.

Match details

See also
2004–05 Coupe de France

External links
Coupe de France results at Rec.Sport.Soccer Statistics Foundation
Report on French federation site

Coupe De France Final
2005
Coupe De France Final 2005
Coupe De France Final 2005
Coupe de France Final
Sport in Saint-Denis, Seine-Saint-Denis
Coupe de France Final